The Essential Wu-Tang Clan is a compilation album by American hip hop group Wu-Tang Clan, which was released October 29, 2013 on Loud and Legacy.
It follows 2011's Legendary Weapons. The Essential Wu-Tang Clan serves as a best of. It features performances by all Wu-Tang members and several affiliates.

Background
The Essential Wu-Tang Clan includes standout tracks from high-profile studio albums, as well as rare soundtrack selections and compilation cuts.

Critical reception

The Essential Wu-Tang Clan was met with positive reviews. It was noted for the influential and groundbreaking sound from the '90s hip-hop collective. With its distinctive style, with dark, atmospheric backing tracks (often punctuated by samples from vintage martial arts movies).

Track listing
Credits adapted from the album's liner notes and Discogs.

Notes
 signifies a co-producer.

References

2013 compilation albums
Wu-Tang Clan albums